The Gardiners warehouse is on Straight Street, Broad Plain, Bristol, England.

It was built in 1865 by William Bruce Gingell and is an example of the Bristol Byzantine style. It was originally part of Christopher Thomas and Brothers' soap works, but is now a warehouse. Some of the original florentine skyline ornament have since disappeared.

In 1958 the Gardiners warehouse became home to what is now known as Gardiner Haskins of Gardiner Sons & Co Ltd, an independent homeware retailer established in 1893. In 1997 the Brunel Garden Centre that sits adjacent to the Gardiners warehouse opened.

It has been designated by English Heritage as a grade II listed building.

In 2018 Gardiner Haskins announced its intention to vacate Gardiners warehouse and move to a new showroom opposite the building.

References

See also
 Grade II listed buildings in Bristol

Warehouses in England
Industrial buildings completed in 1865
Grade II listed buildings in Bristol
Grade II listed industrial buildings
Byzantine Revival architecture in the United Kingdom
1865 establishments in England